Kenneth Jones Terrell (April 29, 1904 – March 8, 1966) was an American western and action film actor and stuntman best known for playing Joe Marcelli in the 1956 film Indestructible Man and Jess in the 1958 film Attack of the 50 Foot Woman.

Biography
Born in the small town of Coolidge, Georgia, Terrell attended Georgia Tech in Atlanta. As a young man, he took up bodybuilding and developed the athletic skills that helped him become a Hollywood stuntman. His roles in action films were usually minor, and sometimes he did stunt work and acting in the same film.

Terrell did only limited stunt work after a foot injury in the late 1950s. He died from arteriosclerosis at the age of 61.

Filmography

References

External links

 

1966 deaths
1904 births
American male film actors
Burials at Oakwood Memorial Park Cemetery
Male actors from Georgia (U.S. state)
20th-century American male actors